Ban Thi is a tambon in Ban Thi District, Lamphun Province, northern Thailand. It lies about 20 km northeast of the town of Lamphun.

History
Ban Thi was settled largely by Tai Lue people who emigrated from Xishuangbanna in Yunnan Province in the early-Rattanakosin era. Tai Lue women are known for their woven fabrics, a staple of the community economy.

References

Tambon of Lamphun province